Abe Meyer (1901–1969) was an American composer of film scores.

Selected filmography
 Painted Faces (1929)
 Honeymoon Lane (1931)
 Unholy Love (1932)
 A Strange Adventure (1932)
 Take the Stand (1934)
 Legong (1935)
 The Unwelcome Stranger (1935)
 Suicide Squad (1935)
 The Mine with the Iron Door (1936)
 The Devil on Horseback (1936)
 Song of the Trail (1936)
 County Fair (1937)
 The 13th Man (1937)
 Raw Timber (1937)
 Roaring Timber (1937)
 The Law Commands (1937)
 The Painted Trail (1938)
 My Old Kentucky Home (1938)
 The Secret of Treasure Island (1938)
 Saleslady (1938)
 Numbered Woman  (1938)
 The Marines Are Here (1938)
 Fisherman's Wharf (1939)
 Undercover Agent (1939)

References

Bibliography
 Rhodes, Gary D. White Zombie: Anatomy of a Horror Film. McFarland, 2001.

External links

1901 births
1969 deaths
20th-century American composers